New Inn Bridge Halt railway station served the village of Amroth, Pembrokeshire, Wales from 1929 to 1937 on the North Pembrokeshire and Fishguard Railway.

History 
The station opened on 14 October 1929 by the North Pembrokeshire and Fishguard Railway. It was situated on the east side of a road on the B4328. It was the busiest of the others, even though it was in a remote area that only served farms and the nearby New Inn. It closed along with the line on 25 October 1937.

References

External links 

Disused railway stations in Pembrokeshire
Former Great Western Railway stations
Railway stations in Great Britain opened in 1929
Railway stations in Great Britain closed in 1937
1929 establishments in Wales
1937 disestablishments in Wales
Puncheston